Newport unitary authority area, in Wales, has 71 scheduled monuments. With a neolithic chambered tomb, three Bronze Age sites and seven Iron Age hillforts, it demonstrates a range of prehistoric occupation. However, with an entire Roman town at Caerleon, and Roman villas and forts, it is an important area for Welsh Roman archaeology. It is unlike much of South Wales in having far more medieval sites (28) than modern ones (4), with hardly any industrial monuments. All of the sites on this list (and the whole of Newport) are within the historic county of Monmouthshire. One site lies on the border into a neighbouring county, and is included on both lists.

Scheduled monuments have statutory protection. The compilation of the list is undertaken by Cadw Welsh Historic Monuments, which is an executive agency of the National Assembly of Wales. The list of scheduled monuments below is supplied by Cadw with additional material from RCAHMW and Glamorgan-Gwent Archaeological Trust.

Scheduled monuments in Newport

See also
List of Cadw properties
List of castles in Wales
List of hill forts in Wales
Historic houses in Wales
List of monastic houses in Wales
List of museums in Wales
List of Roman villas in Wales
Grade I listed buildings in Newport
Grade II* listed buildings in Newport

References
Coflein is the online database of RCAHMW: Royal Commission on the Ancient and Historical Monuments of Wales, GGAT is the Glamorgan-Gwent Archaeological Trust, Cadw is the Welsh Historic Monuments Agency

Newport
Buildings and structures in Newport, Wales